Dr. Mohammad Sadiq Fitrat, born Sadiq Fitrat Habibi,, known professionally as Nashenas, is one of the oldest surviving musicians from Afghanistan. His fame began in the late 1950s, and since then he has produced many albums consisting of Pashto, Dari, and Urdu songs. He is known as "the Afghan Saigal".

Background
Nashenas was born in Kandahar, Afghanistan to an ethnic Pashtun family. He belongs to the famous Habibi family who are Kakar by tribe. This is a religious family which descends from Habibullah Kakar, or Habibullah Akhundzada. His primary education was in Kandahar.

After his father was appointed by the National Bank of Karachi, he moved to British India where he lived without his mother. He encountered classical Indian music, which deeply moved and influenced him. Zakir Husain taught him calligraphy, Persian and Urdu.

While staying in Chaman, near the border of Afghanistan, he went to a school where he experienced an important moment in his musical awakening. Students were celebrating the establishment of their school. Kids used tables as drums while Nashenas sang. He was called to the principal's office. Thinking that he would get punished, he decided to deny that he was singing. On the contrary, he found that school appreciated his talents and encouraged him to perform. He received a medal and five volumes of religious texts.

In 1948 he returned to Afghanistan. Starting from 1953 he begins to sing on Afghan radio and becomes known under his pseudonym "Nashenas". His family stressed to him the importance of religion as he hailed from the religious elite of the city of Kandahar. In the early 1970s, Nashenas traveled to the Soviet Union where he obtained his doctorate in Pashto Literature from Moscow State University.

Since the 90s he lives in London.

Nashenas is still popular in Afghanistan, including in the Pashto-speaking areas of Pakistan. He made one song about Muhammad Iqbal.
 Nashenas has a following among musicians of the new generation as well, who are noted to imitate his style of singing. One of which is Sardar Ali Takkar, a Pashtun musician from Khyber Pakhtunkhwa, Pakistan.

Discography
Note: This list is not comprehensive and does not include albums released in Afghanistan during the 1970s and 1980s. Due to the Soviet–Afghan War in the 1980s and the Taliban ban on music in late the 1990s, all his original music clips and videos from the 1970s and early 1980s have been destroyed. It is claimed that the ones being heard today are mostly copies of the original and the quality is not as good.
 Kharabat e -Moghaan
 Qandahar
 Sokhan-e-Zamana
 Nashinas Live In New York (DVD)

References

External links
 Www.Nashenasmusic.com
 https://nashenas.org/

1935 births
Living people
Pashtun singers
Afghan musicians
Afghan male singers
People from Kandahar
Pashto-language singers
Persian-language singers
20th-century Afghan male singers